Cicerina is a genus of flatworms in the class Rhabditophora.

References

External links 
 

 Cicerina at the World Register of marine Species (WoRMS)

Rhabditophora genera